222nd Aviation Regiment is aviation regiment of the United States Army.

Current configuration

 1st Battalion

References

222